The 1989 FIBA European Champions Cup Final Four was the 1988–89 season's FIBA European Champions Cup Final Four tournament, organized by FIBA Europe.

Jugoplastika won its first title, after defeating Maccabi Elite Tel Aviv in the final game.

Bracket

Semifinals

Maccabi Elite – Aris

FC Barcelona – Jugoplastika

Third place game

Final

Awards

FIBA European Champions Cup Final Four MVP 
  Dino Rađa ( Jugoplastika)

FIBA European Champions Cup Finals Top Scorer 
  Doron Jamchi ( Maccabi Elite Tel Aviv)

References

External links 
 1988–89 EuroLeague at FIBAEurope.com
 Linguasport

1988–89 in European basketball
1988–89
1989 in West German sport
1989 in Greek sport
1988–89 in Spanish basketball
1989 in Israeli sport
1988–89 in Yugoslav basketball
International basketball competitions hosted by West Germany
Sports competitions in Munich
1980s in Munich